Johan Halvorsen (15 March 1864 – 4 December 1935) was a Norwegian composer, conductor and violinist.

Life 
Born in Drammen, he was an accomplished violinist from a very early age and became a prominent figure in Norwegian musical life. He received his musical education in Kristiania (now Oslo) and Stockholm, and was a concertmaster in Bergen before joining the Leipzig Gewandhaus Orchestra. He was a concertmaster in Aberdeen, then a professor of music in Helsinki, and finally became a student once again, in St Petersburg, Leipzig (with Adolph Brodsky), Berlin (with Adolf Becker), and Liège (with César Thomson).

Returning to Norway in 1893, he worked as conductor of the theatre orchestra at Den Nationale Scene in Bergen and of the Bergen Philharmonic Orchestra. He became concertmaster of the Bergen Philharmonic in 1885, and principal conductor in 1893. In 1899 he was appointed conductor of the orchestra at the newly opened National Theatre in Kristiania, a position he held for 30 years until his retirement in 1929.

As well as theatre music, Halvorsen conducted performances of over 30 operas and also wrote the incidental music for more than 30 plays. Following his retirement from the theatre he finally had time to concentrate on the composition of his three symphonies and two well-known Norwegian rhapsodies.

Halvorsen's compositions were a development of the national romantic tradition exemplified by Edvard Grieg though written in a distinctive style marked by innovative orchestration.  Halvorsen married Grieg's niece, and orchestrated some of his piano works, such as a funeral march which was played at Grieg's funeral. Five days after Halvorsen died, Grieg's cousin and widow Nina Grieg also died.

His best known works today are the Bojarenes inntogsmarsj (Entry March of the Boyars) and Bergensiana, along with his Passacaglia and Sarabande, duos for violin and viola based on themes by George Frideric Handel.

In early 2016, librarians at the University of Toronto announced that they had located the manuscript score of his violin concerto, performed only three times in 1909 and considered lost. The piece received its fourth performance, 107 years later, in 2016.

Selected compositions
Operetta
Mod Nordpolen, in 3 acts (1911); libretto by Vilhelm Dybwad

Incidental music
Gurre, Op. 17; music for the play by Holger Drachmann
Nordraakiana
Askeladden
Reisen til Julestjernen (Journey to the Christmas Star); music for the play by Sverre Brandt
Tordenskjold, Op. 18; music for the historical play by Jacob Breda Bull
Kongen (The King), Op. 19; music for the play by Bjørnstjerne Bjørnson
Fossegrimen, Op. 21; music for the play by Sigurd Eldegard
Vasantasena; music for the old Indian play
The Merchant of Venice; music for the Shakespeare play
Much Ado about Nothing (1915); music for the Shakespeare play
Livet i skogen, Op. 33; music for William Shakespeare's As You Like It
Dronning Tamara (Queen Tamara); music for the play by Knut Hamsun
Macbeth (1920); music for the Shakespeare play

Orchestra
Bojarenes inntogsmarsj (Entry March of the Boyars) for orchestra (or concert band) (1895)
Festovertyre (Norwegian Festival Overture), Op. 16 (1899)
Nächtlicher Zug from Miniatures for string orchestra, Op. 29 No. 2 (1910); arrangement by the composer
Bjørnstjerne Bjørnson in Memoriam, Op. 30 (1910)
Norway's Greeting to Theodore Roosevelt, Op. 31 (1910)
Suite ancienne to the Memory of Ludvig Holberg, Op. 31 (1911)
Festmarsj (Festival March). Op. 32
Scène funèbre
Sérénade, Op. 33 (1913)
Bergensiana, Rococo Variations on an Old Melody from Bergen "Jeg tog min nystemte Cithar i Hænde" (I Took Up My Newly Tuned Zither) (1913)
Norske rapsodie No. 1 (Norwegian Rhapsody No. 1) in A major (1919–1920)
     Springar
     I went so lately to my bed
     Halling - Springar
Norske rapsodie No. 2 (Norwegian Rhapsody No. 2) in G major (1919–1920)
     Dance tune from Åmot
     Han Ole
     Springar
Symphony No. 1 in C minor (1923)
Symphony No. 2 "Fatum" in D minor (1924, revised 1928)
Symphony No. 3 in C major (1929)
Norske eventyrbylleder (Norwegian Fairy-tale Pictures), Op. 37 (1933); reworking of 1925 incidental music
     Peik, prinsessen og stortrollet (Peik, the Princess and the Big Troll)
     Prinsessen kommer ridende på bjørnen (The Princess Comes Riding on a Bear)
     Trollenes inntog i berget det blå (Entry of the Trolls into the Town Hall)
     Dans av småtroll (Dance of the Little Trolls)
Festovertyre (Norwegian Festival Overture), Op. 38
Elegi for string orchestra
Forspill til den hvite Ring
Rabnabryllaup uti Kraakjalund, Norwegian Folk-Song Arrangement for string orchestra

Concert band
Hallingdal Bataljon's Marsj (1882–1883)
Gatemarsj (Street March)
Norwegian Sea Picture
Salutation to the Royal Couple of Norway

Concertante
Air norvégien (Norwegian Air) for violin and orchestra, Op. 7 (1896/1903).
Veslemøy's Song for violin and orchestra (1898); dedicated to Kathleen Parlow
Norwegian Song "The Old Fisherman's Song" for violin and string orchestra, Op. 31 (1901, 1913)
Andante Religioso for violin and orchestra (1903)
Concerto in G minor for violin and orchestra, Op. 28 (1909); dedicated to Kathleen Parlow
Bryllupsmarsch, Norwegian Wedding March for violin and orchestra, Op. 32 No. 1
Danses norvégiennes No. 1 for violin and orchestra (1915)
Danses norvégiennes No. 2 for violin and orchestra (1915)

Chamber music
6 Stimmungsbilder (6 Mood Pieces) for violin and piano (1890)
Suite in G minor for violin and piano (1890)
Danses norvégiennes for violin and piano (1897)
Elegie (Andante) for violin and piano (1897)
Passacaglia in G minor on a Theme by George Frideric Handel (from Harpsichord Suite in G minor, HWV 432) for violin and viola (1897)
Sarabande con variazioni in D minor on a Theme by George Frideric Handel for violin and viola (1897)
Crépuscule for violin and piano (c. 1898)
Suite Mosaïque for violin and piano (1898)
     Intermezzo orientale
     Entr'acte
     Scherzino – "Spurven" (The Sparrow)
     Veslemøys sang (Veslemøy's Song)
     Fête nuptial rustique (An Old-fashioned Wedding)
String Quartet in E, Op. 10
Little Dance Suite for violin and piano, Op. 22
Slåtter, Peasant Dances for violin solo (1903)
Miniatures, 5 Easy Pieces for 2 violins and piano, Op. 29 (1910)
To serenader (Two Serenades) for violin and piano
Norske viser og danse (Norwegian Folk Songs and Dances), 30 Folk Arrangements for violin and piano
Concert Caprice on Norwegian Melodies for 2 violins

Choral
Varde, Cantata for male chorus and orchestra, Op. 11 (1904); words by Per Sivle
Alrune for soprano solo, female chorus and chamber orchestra, Op. 20 No. 1
Kantate ved kroningen i Trondhjems Domkirke den 22 juni 1906 for soprano, baritone, mixed chorus, orchestra, harp and organ, Op. 27 (1906); words by Sigvald Skavlan
Bergensiana for mixed chorus

Media

References

External links
Johan Halvorsen — Beyond the Transitory

1864 births
1935 deaths
19th-century classical composers
19th-century conductors (music)
20th-century classical composers
20th-century conductors (music)
20th-century Norwegian male musicians
Male conductors (music)
Musicians from Bergen
Norwegian classical composers
Norwegian conductors (music)
Norwegian male classical composers
Norwegian Romantic composers
Musicians from Drammen
Norwegian military musicians
20th-century Norwegian composers